, also known as TECHNOuchi, is a Japanese composer, sound designer, and musician.

Career
Takznouchi began his career in the game industry at Konami in 1989, which proved to be challenging as he had no formal musical training. Takenouchi wanted to compose music for the NES, but was assigned to work for PC. He composed for multiple games, most notably SD Snatcher and Metal Gear 2: Solid Snake. Takenouchi considers 1989's Space Manbow to be his best MSX-era work. Takenouchi also worked on multiple arcade games, including X-Men. He found arcade game music and sound design to offer different challenges as arcades are a crowded environment. In 1996, Takenouchi left Konami to join Sony Computer Entertainment after participating in the project "Let's Play Games" ("Game Yarouze"), which Sony hosted.

In 1996 Takenouchi composed the soundtrack for Circadia for the PlayStation, which was his first project for the platform. While unsatisfied with the final product, the soundtrack was positively received, and Takenouchi would arrange songs from the soundtrack 10 years later. In the same year, Takenouchi composed for TomaRunner, drawing inspiration from various genres including techno, rock and roll, and baroque. In 2002, Takenouchi composed the soundtrack of ChainDive with Hideyuki Eto, who previously contributed music for Circadia and sound design for Sky Gunner. After leaving Sony, Takenouchi was approached to compose music for Ace Combat X: Skies of Deception. Takenouchi was managing a school at the time, leading to hectic schedule. He suggested Akira Yamasaki as a composer, acting as a supervisor instead. Takenouchi later joined FromSoftware, where he worked on sound design for Demon's Souls with Hideyuki Eto, marking their fourth collaboration. As Takenouchi was inexperienced with orchestral scores, he brought Shunsuke Kida to compose the soundtrack. Takenouchi would then work on sound design for the game's 2011 spiritual successor Dark Souls. Takenouchi contributed to the Monster Hunter 10th Anniversary Compilation Album, which released in October 2014. After working on sound design for Dark Souls II, Takenouchi left FromSoftware. 

Takenouchi later joined Access Games, after a conversation with producer Nobuo Tomita. Takenouchi served as sound director and composer for D4: Dark Dreams Don't Die, working on sound direction from the second episode onwards. The sound team was given reference material by Hidetaka Suehiro and Hiroyuki Saegusa through existing songs from various dramas and movies. In 2016, Takenouchi left Access Games to join iNiS. A compilation of Takenouchi's three house-inspired extended plays, Brand New Day, Southern Paradise, and Parfum was released in March 2017 by Apollo Records and titled after the first EP. Takenouchi contributed to KE-TSU-I kizunajigokutachi, an arrangement album of music from Ketsui: Kizuna Jigoku Tachi, which released in August 2020. Takenouchi produced Saki Hayash's mini-album, TESTAMENT, which released in May 22, 2021.

Works

References

External links
 
Discography at VGMdb

1969 births
Japanese techno musicians
Living people
Musicians from Kyoto Prefecture
People from Kyoto
Video game composers